Tymoteusz Karpowicz (15 December 1921 in Zielona near Vilnius – 29 June 2005 in Oak Park near Chicago) was a leading Polish language poet and playwright.

Biography 
Born in the village of Zielona, near Vilnius, Karpowicz lived there until the outbreak of World War II in 1939. Karpowicz debuted as a journalist in 1941 under the pseudonym Tadeusz Lirmian for the Vilnius-based newspaper Prawda Wileńska. During the Nazi occupation of Lithuania he was a member of the Polish Resistance. When the war came to an end in 1945, Karpowicz was resettled to Szczecin where he worked for Polish Radio. It was here Karpowicz published his first prose piece titled Legendy pomorskie ("Pomeranian Legends").

Karpowicz moved to Wrocław studied Polish philology at Wroclaw University where he received his M.A. and Ph.D. and became an assistant professor. He later received the Literary Prize of the City of Wroclaw in 1958.

Life after leaving Poland
In 1971, Karpowicz received the prestigious fellowship of the "Foundation pour une Entraide Intellectuelle Europeenne" in Paris. Two years later in 1973 he was invited to join International Working Program at the University of Iowa. In 1974, he was appointed visiting associate professor of Polish literature at the University of Illinois at Chicago, where he taught for two years. Although he has never received any official literary awards in Poland because of his stance as a political dissident, he was awarded the prestigious Alfred Jurzykowski Prize in New York City and was twice a recipient of the Illinois Arts Council Annual Award.

He spent the next two years in West Germany (1976–78) in Bonn, West Berlin, Munich, and Regensburg Universities. In 1978, he returned to the University of Illinois at Chicago Department of Slavic Languages and Literatures as a full professor.

After Lithuania declared its independence in 1990, Karpowicz wrote several articles in the Polish press encouraging the Government of Poland to recognize Lithuania.

Karpowicz retired from the now Department of Slavic and Baltic Literatures at the University of Illinois at Chicago in 1993. Karpowicz died on June 26, 2005 at his home in Oak Park, Illinois. His remains were repatriated and he was buried on August 3, 2005 along with his wife Maria in Osobowice Cemetery in Wrocław.

Legacy
Contemporary Polish-Italian sculptor Krzysztof Michał Bednarski dedicated his 2016 art exhibition Gravity to Karpowicz.

It was announced in 2019 that Karpowicz's villa in Wrocław would become the future home of Nobel Laureate Olga Tokarczuk's Foundation. Aside from Tokarczuk, Agnieszka Holland and Ireneusz Grin will join her on the foundation's board of directors. The writer will allocate the 350,000 zlotys she was awarded upon winning the Nobel Prize.

Selected works 

 Legendy pomorskie, 1948
 Żywe wymiary, 1948
 Gorzkie źródła, 1957 
 Kamienna muzyka, 1958
 Znaki równania, 1960
 W imię znaczenia, 1962
 Trudny las, 1964
 Opowiadania turystyczne, 1966 
 Wiersze wybrane, 1969
 Odwrócone światło
 Poezja niemożliwa. Modele Leśmianowskiej wyobraźni, 1975
 Rozwiązywanie przestrzeni: poemat polimorficzny (fragmenty)
 Słoje zadrzewne, 1999
 Małe cienie wielkich czarnoksiężników. Zarejestrowane w paśmie cyfr od 797 do 7777, 2007

Plays 

 Zielone rękawice, 1960 
 Człowiek z absolutnym węchem, 1964 
 Dziwny pasażer, 1964 
 Kiedy ktoś zapuka, 1967
 Charon od świtu do świtu

References

Further reading 
 
 
 
 
 Krystyna Latawiec, „Dramat poetycki po 1956 roku: Jarosław M. Rymkiewicz, Stanisław Grochowiak, Tymoteusz Karpowicz”, Wydawnictwo Naukowe Akademii Pedagogicznej, Kraków 2007

2005 deaths
1921 births
20th-century Polish poets
20th-century Polish dramatists and playwrights
20th-century American poets
20th-century translators
American Roman Catholic poets
Commanders of the Order of Polonia Restituta
Polish amputees
Polish emigrants to the United States
Polish poets
Polish Roman Catholics
People with acquired American citizenship
Roman Catholic writers
Translators from Polish
University of Illinois Chicago faculty
University of Wrocław alumni
Academic staff of the University of Wrocław
Writers from Szczecin
Writers from Oak Park, Illinois
Writers from Vilnius